The Abandoned Shipwrecks Act is a piece of United States legislation passed into law in 1988 meant to protect historic shipwrecks in US waters from treasure hunters and unauthorised salvagers by transferring the title to the wreck to the US state whose waters it lies in.

Background 
The Abandoned Shipwrecks Act (Pub. L. 100-298), also known as the Abandoned Shipwrecks Act of 1987, was passed into law due to severe damage to some 3,000 historic wrecks in the Great Lakes and off the US coasts that had been salvaged, and in some cases ruined, by treasure hunters in the 1970s. On April 29, 1988, President Ronald Reagan signed the bill (Abandoned Shipwrecks Act of 1987, Pub. L. 100-298, 102 Stat. 432) into law.

Provisions  
The law provides that any wreck that lies embedded in a state's submerged lands is property of that state and subject to that state's jurisdiction if the wreck is determined as being abandoned.  The National Park Service website states that these include:

abandoned shipwrecks embedded in a State's submerged lands; abandoned shipwrecks embedded in coralline formations protected by a State on its submerged lands; and abandoned shipwrecks located on a State's submerged lands and included in or determined eligible for inclusion in the National Register of Historic Places."  
 
In section 3, the act outlines what is meant by the use of certain words.  In the case of the term "embedded," it states that it

... means firmly affixed in the submerged lands or in coralline formations such that the use of tools of excavation is required in order to move the bottom sediments to gain access to the shipwreck, its cargo, and any part thereof.

Also, the term "submerged lands" refers to "lands beneath navigable waters", and "state" denotes "a state of the United States of America, District of Columbia, Puerto Rico, Guam, the Virgin Islands, American Samoa, and the Northern Mariana Islands."

Exclusions
The law does not protect military wrecks (which are always owned by the countries by which they were commissioned) or wrecks that lie on Native American land.

Controversies 
The act has come under fire due to its ambiguous wording.  States make the claim that all shipwrecks that lay embedded in their waters are abandoned and under their jurisdiction.  Some people claim that only the 10% most historic of all wrecks belong to states.  The confusion has resulted in numerous court cases over ownership and salvage rights of the wreck.  Salvagers argue that the states need to prove to the public which wrecks are historic and are protected under the Act, while the states claim that the salvager needs to provide proof of ownership if they are to salvage any parts, sediment, artifacts, etc., of the wreck.

References 

1988 in law
100th United States Congress
Shipwreck law
United States federal admiralty and maritime legislation